Hazel Farris (c. 1880 – December 20, 1906) was an American woman whose purported mummified remains traveled the American South and were displayed for decades at the Bessemer Hall of History in Bessemer, Alabama as Hazel the Mummy. After appearing in a television documentary, her remains were cremated by her Nashville owners.

Background
Farris was born in Kentucky in 1880 and was orphaned as a child. She eventually married and lived near Louisville with her husband. Accounts about the marriage vary; some accounts claim neighbors said the couple were both hard drinkers who fought violently, while other accounts claim the couple mostly lived a quiet life and only fought about Farris’ spendthrift ways when her husband drank.

According to folklore, on August 6, 1905, the couple had an argument over Farris’ desire to purchase a new hat. The argument led to blows and Farris ended up fatally shooting her husband who died on the floor of the living room. Hearing gun shots, neighbors summoned the police. Upon arriving, Farris fatally shot the three responding officers as well. When a passing deputy sheriff heard the commotion, he decided to investigate. After gaining entry into the Farris home, the deputy tried to restrain Farris. During the scuffle, the deputy tripped on Farris’ husband's body, accidentally discharging his weapon and shooting off the ring finger on Farris’ right hand in the process. Farris eventually broke free and fatally shot the deputy.

With a $500 reward for her capture, Farris fled from Kentucky and eventually settled in Bessemer, Alabama to begin a new life. It was there that she reportedly began working as a prostitute to support herself and drank heavily. In another version of the story, Farris posed as a schoolmarm and, overcome with guilt over murdering five men, drank in excess in private.
She then began a relationship with an unnamed man who, in some accounts, was a police officer. After they became engaged, Farris either decided to come clean about her past to her fiancé or began imbibing and drunkenly revealed to her fiancé that she was wanted for murder. The man immediately turned Farris in to the police because of his devotion to the law or, most likely, for the reward money. On December 20, 1906, before she could be captured, Farris took to her room where she began (or continued) drinking heavily. She then committed suicide by drinking whiskey and arsenic or possibly strychnine.

The corpse

Farris’ body was taken to Adams Vermillion Furniture which also sold caskets and functioned as a funeral parlor. No one showed up to claim her, but the body wasn't decomposing, either—supposedly an effect of the poison. With an endless supply of curious visitors the proprietor started charging 10¢ a gander to see the notorious outlaw. The corpse was later loaned out to various exhibitors, including Adams' brother in Tuscaloosa, before it came into the possession of O. C. Brooks in 1907. He featured the well-preserved remains in his traveling show for 40 years. When he died, Brooks left Farris’ corpse to his nephew, on the condition that any money raised from displaying her be donated to charity.

Brooks' nephew used Farris corpse to raise money to build churches in Tennessee before bringing her back to Bessemer, where she became an infamous attraction at the newly formed Hall of History. After a long run, and an appearance in a National Geographic Channel documentary, the owners of Farris’ corpse had it cremated.

An autopsy performed for the documentary indicated that the mummified woman died of pneumonia. A finger was, indeed, shot off about a year before her death. The procedure further determined that the body was replete with arsenic, but it appeared she had been immersed in, not ingested, that particular poison.

Bessemer had no embalmers in those days, so any preservation bath would have been done by amateurs using materials at hand. The documentary makers found no archival evidence from newspapers of these events, leading to the assumption that the story was crafted to fit the remains.

References
 Katz, Elaine S. (Winter 1978) "Variation as Relative Perception in the Legend of Hazel Farris". Mid-South Folklore Vol. 6, No. 3, pp. 55–64
 Abrams, Vivi. (November 1, 2004) "Bessemer mummy legend endures." Birmingham News.
 "National Geographic probes story of Ada mummy." Claremore Daily Progress
 "An Unwanted Mummy". The Mummy Road Show Episode 12. National Geographic Channel (April 1, 2002)
 Quigley, Christine. (1998) Modern Mummies: The Preservation of the Human Body in the Twentieth Century. Jefferson, North Carolina: McFarland & Company. 
 Conlogue, Jeremy and Ron Beckett. (September 2005) Mummy Dearest:How Two Guys in a Potato Chip Truck Changed the Way the Living See the Dead

External links

1906 suicides
Deaths from pneumonia in Alabama
Mummies
People from Louisville, Kentucky
People from Birmingham, Alabama
Sideshow attractions
Suicides in Alabama
Suicides by poison
Year of birth uncertain